The 1967 Calgary Stampeders finished in 1st place in the Western Conference with a 12–4 record. They were defeated in the Western Final by the Saskatchewan Roughriders.

Regular season

Season standings

Season schedule

Playoffs

West Finals

 Saskatchewan wins the best of three series 2–1. The Roughriders will advance to the Grey Cup Championship game. .

Awards and records

1967 CFL All-Stars

References

Calgary Stampeders seasons
1967 Canadian Football League season by team